This is a list of public holidays in Senegal.

Public holidays

Variable dates

2020
Easter Monday – April 13
Korité (Breaking of the Ramadan fast) – May 24
Whit Monday – June 1
Tabaski (Feast of the Sacrifice) – starts July 31
Ashura – starts sundown, August 28
Grand Magal of Touba – October 6
Mawlid (Prophet's birthday) – starts at sundown, October 28
2021
Easter Monday – April 5
Korité (Breaking of the Ramadan fast) – May 13
Whit Monday – May 29
Tabaski (Feast of the Sacrifice) – starts July 20
Grand Magal of Touba – September 26
Mawlid (Prophet's birthday) – starts at sundown, October 18
2022
Easter Monday – April 18
Korité (Breaking of the Ramadan fast)– May 3
Whit Monday – June 6
Tabaski (Feast of the Sacrifice) – starts July 10
Grand Magal of Touba – September 14
Mawlid (Prophet's birthday) – starts at sundown, October 7
2023
Easter Monday – April 10
Korité (Breaking of the Ramadan fast)– April 21
Whit Monday – May 29
Tabaski (Feast of the Sacrifice) – starts June 28
Mawlid  (Prophet's birthday) – starts at sundown, September 26
2024
Easter Monday – April 2
Korité (Breaking of the Ramadan fast)– April 10
Whit Monday – May 20
Tabaski (Feast of the Sacrifice) – starts June 17
2025
Easter Monday – April 23
2026
Easter Monday – April 6
2027
Easter Monday – April 29
2028
Easter Monday – April 17
2029
Easter Monday – April 2

References 

 
Senegalese culture
Senegal
Holidays